Theo Shall (1896–1955) was a German stage and film actor. He was born in Metz when it was part of the German Empire but left following its occupation by France following the First World War.

Selected filmography
 Das Spielzeug von Paris (1925)
 Anna Christie (1930) as Matt Burke
 The Adventurer of Tunis (1931) as René
 Five from the Jazz Band (1932) as Martin
 Rasputin, Demon with Women (1932) as Lieutenant Suschkoff
 Shadows of Paris (1932)
 Spring in the Air (1934) as Paul
 Fruit in the Neighbour's Garden (1935) as Theo
 Ten Minute Alibi (1935) as Phillip Sevilla
 Tango Notturno (1937) as Officer Phillip
 The Grey Lady (1937) as Harry Morrel
 The Tiger of Eschnapur (1938) as the manager of the Crystal Palace
 Pour le Mérite (1937) as Capitain Cecil Wood
 Cadets (1939) as Capitain Jupow
 Escape in the Dark (1939) as René Laroche
 The Rothschilds (1940) as Selfridge
 Happiness Is the Main Thing (1941)
 Carl Peters (1941) as Robert Mitchell
 Geheimakte W.B.1 (1942) as Mr. Wood
 The Red Terror (1942) as a saboteur
 Titanic (1943) as 1st Officer Murdoch
 Kolberg (1945) as Louis Henri Loison
 Zugverkehr unregelmäßig (1951)
 Story of a Young Couple (1952) as the prosecutor
 Geheimakten Solvay (1953) as Director Menneke
 Stärker als die Nacht (1954) as Dr.Panneck
 Der Fall Dr. Wagner (1954) as Rolling
 Swings or Roundabouts (1954) as Muhlberger
 Hotelboy Ed Martin (1955)

References

Bibliography

External links

1896 births
1955 deaths
German male film actors
German male silent film actors
20th-century German male actors
German male stage actors
Actors from Metz